Abdul Latif Anabila (born 15 April 1997) is a Ghanaian football midfielder who plays for Asante Kotoko.

References

1997 births
Living people
Ghanaian footballers
Ghana international footballers
New Edubiase United F.C. players
Club Africain players
Ashanti Gold SC players
Association football midfielders
Ghanaian expatriate footballers
Expatriate footballers in Tunisia
Ghanaian expatriate sportspeople in Tunisia
Competitors at the 2015 African Games
African Games competitors for Ghana